Bilauktaung is a subrange of the Tenasserim Hills. It is located in Burma on the border with Thailand. It extends from the Dawna Range for about 400 km along the frontier area to the Kra Isthmus.

Geography
The Bilauktaung includes Myinmoletkat Taung 2,072 m, the highest point of the northern section of the Tenasserim range, and, with a prominence of 1,857 m, one of the ultra prominent peaks of Southeast Asia. Other peaks are 1,531 m high Ngayanni Kyauk Taung, 1,455 m high Palan Taung and 992 m high Baulu Taung, among other similarly high summits.

The whole Bilauktaung is sparsely inhabited and covered with thick tropical rain forest. Usually the western mountainsides are more heavily forested than the eastern for they receive heavier monsoon rains.

See also
List of mountains of Burma

References

Tenasserim Hills
Mountain ranges of Myanmar